The 1926 Tennessee Docs football team (variously "Docs", "UT Doctors" or the "Tennessee Medicos") represented the University of Tennessee College of Medicine in Memphis in the 1926 college football season. It was their last season of play. The final game saw Vanderbilt teammates Gil Reese and Jess Neely coach against one another.

Schedule

References

Tennessee Docs
Tennessee Docs football seasons
Tennessee Docs football